Dustin Brown and Rogier Wassen were the defending champions, but decided not to participate.
Jamie Murray and André Sá won the title, defeating Lukáš Dlouhý and Marcelo Melo 6–4, 7–6(9–7) in the final.

Seeds

Draw

Draw

References
 Main Draw

Doubles